Lucas von Deschwanden (born 5 June 1989) is a Swiss handball player for Chambéry Savoie and the Swiss national team.

He represented Switzerland at the 2020 European Men's Handball Championship.

References

1989 births
Living people
Swiss male handball players
Expatriate handball players
Swiss expatriate sportspeople in France